Live 2002 is the first live album by American rock band Comes with the Fall. The album served as a companion to their Live Underground 2002 DVD later released in 2003.

Track listing

Personnel
Comes with the Fall
Bevan Davies — drums
William DuVall — vocals, guitar
Adam Stanger — bass guitar
Production
 Christopher Horvath - engineering
 Russ Fowler - mixing
 Alex Lowe - mastering
 Josh Paul - live sound engineering
 William DuVall - production

References

2002 live albums
Comes with the Fall albums